nDreams, Ltd. is a company that develops and publishes video games.  It is located in Farnborough, Hampshire in the United Kingdom. The company was formed in August 2006 by former SCi and Eidos creative director, Patrick O'Luanaigh.   Since formation, the developer has worked on numerous projects for different video game platforms, initially PlayStation Home, the virtual world on Sony's PlayStation 3 console, where they grew to become one of the leading publishers.   From late 2013 nDreams began working on content for virtual reality (VR) headsets, such as Sony's PlayStation VR, Oculus Rift and Samsung Gear VR.   nDreams has stated that they are now entirely focused on developing content for virtual reality.

Virtual reality
Since 2013, nDreams has focused on developing content for virtual reality headsets.

The first game released by nDreams for virtual reality was the tech demo SkyDIEving, which launched in 2013.   This saw players freefalling through the sky until they inevitably crashed to their doom on the ground. Patrick O'Luanaigh stated that nDreams had seen "fantastic" reaction to SkyDIEving since it was released in 2013 and the demo received many plaudits.

In June 2014 at the E3 video game show nDreams announced The Assembly, which is planned for release on the Oculus Rift and Sony PlayStation VR headsets.  The Assembly is an adventure game where you uncover the morally dubious secrets of an unknown scientific organisation from the perspective of two different characters.

Following the announcement of the Samsung Gear VR headset in September 2014, nDreams announced two titles that would be released for the headset.   Gunner is a video game where the player wields a gun turret in outer space, shooting down the incoming enemy spacecraft.   Perfect Beach is a relaxation experience where users sit on a tropical beach and take in vistas or listen to the meditation track.   A demo for Gunner released in January 2015 on the Oculus Home store for the Samsung Gear VR headset.   Full products of both Gunner and Perfect Beach are due to release in early 2015.

In December 2014 nDreams announced a new partnership with VR filmmakers Virtual View Productions. The partnership would allow them to explore the crossover between VR video games and movies.

nDreams has previously stated they also have other products in development for virtual reality headsets.   They have also stated they are focused entirely on developing content for VR devices.

In February 2021, nDreams announced that they were moving into third-party publishing and had set up a $2 million dollar development fund.

In July 2021 nDreams the opening of a new studio, nDreams Studio Orbital, which would develop live VR games.

In October 2021, they announced that Little Cities, a VR game developed by Purple Yonder, was their first third-party published game.

In January 2022 nDreams announced the opening of a second studio nDreams Studio Elevation, which would develop AAA and VR games.

In March 2022, nDreams announced that they had received a $35 million investment from the Aonic Group.

In April 2022, Mark Zuckerberg announced Ghostbusters VR at the Meta Quest Gaming Showcase. nDreams were revealed as the developers of the cooperative multiplayer VR game. 

In December 2022, nDreams announced it had acquired the Brighton-based virtual reality studio, Near Light for an undisclosed sum.

VRFocus.com

In early 2014, nDreams launched a consumer website focused on virtual reality called VRFocus.   This is run on an independent basis and was founded by editor-in-chief, Kevin Joyce.

In February 2016, VRFocus launched VRTV, a fortnightly web show presented by Zeena Al-Obaidi.

nDreams sold VRFocus in 2017.

PlayStation Home

nDreams claimed to be one of the world's leading independent developers and publishers in PlayStation Home,   the virtual world on Sony's PlayStation 3 console. The company created numerous games, virtual spaces and items for the platform between 2009 and 2014.

The first project created by nDreams for PlayStation Home was the world's first console-based and virtual world-based alternate reality game, Xi.  Xi was released on March 23, 2009 and lasted a total of 12 weeks, taking place within PlayStation Home, across the web and in the real world.

nDreams next project for Home was a personal space called "The Pirate Galleon Apartment" which also released in 2009. This was the European Home's first personal space to have a mini-game with prizes.  In 2010, nDreams released another personal space called "Musicality". In this space users could play a multiplayer music game.
 
In 2011, nDreams released a new game space called "Aurora" where PlayStation Home users can visit and play various mini games, receive rewards and hang out with fellow users.    Aurora has had over 18 million visits from 1.8 million unique players, making it nDreams' most successful project in PlayStation Home.

nDreams also created numerous virtual items for use on a player's avatar as well as many more spaces.
 
PlayStation Home closed 31 March 2015.  At the time the closure was announced nDreams stated they would continue to release additional content ahead of the closure of the platform.   On reflection of PlayStation Home's success, CEO Patrick O'Luanaigh stated that PlayStation Home "was a commercial success" for nDreams.

Early projects

In early 2008, nDreams contributed to educational tool iStories.

Venus Redemption was an episodic video game that was in development by nDreams. The game was to cater primarily to a female audience around 30 years of age. It was to be released for Microsoft Windows, Mac, iPhone, Wii, and web browsers, but the game was put on hold while nDreams focused on other projects. The game was planned to be dialogue-heavy. The story was being written by Kate Pullinger, with help from comic book writer Gordon Rennie, the music was to be composed by Tim Wright, and it was to be directed by Robin Shepperd. The first season of the game was to be composed of six ninety-minute episodes, and they were to be released on either a weekly or bi-weekly schedule. It was being developed with the Unity engine. After a great response to an early demo, Venus Redemption was put on hold while nDreams focused on other projects, such as PlayStation Home and other third party projects.
Project Y is currently in development for mobile phones running Android and iOS.
Spirit of Adventure
StreetDance 3D, a Facebook app, is a collaborative project between nDreams and Vertigo Films based on the StreetDance 3D movie.
 Lewis Hamilton: Secret Life is nDreams's second alternate reality game. It was not based in PlayStation Home like Xi was. The ARG was created for Reebok, who also co-developed the game. Wired called it 'one of the most engaging, interactive, and exciting games of 2010.' The game launched in March 2010 and ran until November 2010, with over 637,000 players from 154 countries taking part. They worked together to solve puzzles and complete tests online, on mobiles and in the real world. Live events took place across the globe including tasks in Spain, Lebanon, Malaysia, India and the United Kingdom. The game was run in nine languages (English, French, Italian, German, Spanish, Japanese, Mandarin Chinese, Turkish and Korean), which Guinness acknowledged as a world record for a game of this type in 2013.

Funding

In January 2015, nDreams announced a $2.75 million investment from Mercia Technologies.  This investment is planned to allow the studio to expand and invest in research and development of virtual reality games.  One of Mercia's leaders, former Sega CEO Mike Hayes, joined the nDreams board of directors in 2014.

In March 2022, nDreams announced that they had received a $35 million investment from the Aonic Group.

Awards and nominations

2008: Develop "Hot companies to look out for"  
2009: Edge Magazine 'XI project for PlayStation Home" 
2009: Develop Award "Best New Studio" nominee.
2010: Develop Award "Business Development" nominee. 
2010: Kemp Little Innovation Award "Outstanding Business innovation" nominee 
2011: Develop Award "Business Development" nominee
2011: Smarta 100 Awards Winner 
2012: Inspire "Online Excellence" Award Winner     
2014: Santander "Breakthrough 50" Winner
2014: Tiga Awards "Independent Studio" nominee
2019: Viveport Developer Award "Arcade - PC" for Shooty Fruity Arcade
2019: Game Critics Award "Best VR/AR Game" for Phantom: Covert Ops
2020: Lloyds Business Award: Exporter of the Year
2020: Tiga Awards: Best VR Game for Phantom: Covert Ops

References

External links
 

Video game companies of the United Kingdom
Video game development companies